Arnold Danford Patrick Heeney,  (April 5, 1902 – December 20, 1970) was a Canadian lawyer, diplomat and civil servant.

He was born in Montreal, Quebec. He was educated at St. John's College, Winnipeg and received a Bachelor of Arts degree in 1921 and a Master of Arts degree in 1923 both from the University of Manitoba. As the Manitoba Rhodes Scholar he went on to St. John's College, Oxford before returning to Canada, earning a Bachelor of Civil Law degree at McGill University.

Specializing in Maritime law, in 1929 he joined the Montreal law firm of Meredith, Holden, Heward & Holden. In one of his last cases with the firm, he successfully represented F. R. Scott against the City of Westmount.

In 1938, he took the position of Principal Secretary to Prime Minister William Lyon Mackenzie King. From 1940 to 1949, he was Clerk of the Privy Council and Secretary to the Cabinet. He was perhaps the most important civil servant during World War II.

In 1949, he became Under Secretary of State for External Affairs, then Ambassador to the North Atlantic Treaty Organization. He was Canada's Ambassador to the United States from 1953 to 1957 and 1959 to 1962.

In 1968, he was made a Companion of the Order of Canada. He died in Ottawa in 1970.

References

External links
 Arnold Heeney at The Canadian Encyclopedia

1902 births
1970 deaths
Anglophone Quebec people
Ambassadors of Canada to the United States
Canadian Anglicans
Canadian Rhodes Scholars
Clerks of the Privy Council (Canada)
Companions of the Order of Canada
Members of the King's Privy Council for Canada
Lawyers from Montreal
University of Manitoba alumni
Permanent Representatives of Canada to NATO
Alumni of St John's College, Oxford
20th-century Canadian lawyers
McGill University Faculty of Law alumni